Ballad of the Blues is an album by vocalist Jo Stafford that was released in 1959. She is supported by the Starlighters, a male vocal quartet, and an orchestra led by Paul Weston, her husband.

Stafford sings pop, jazz, and blues songs which form a concept album. These include cover versions of traditional songs such as "Nobody Knows the Trouble I've Seen", "Sometimes I Feel Like a Motherless Child", and "Lover Man" in addition to original songs written by Alan and Marilyn Bergman.

Track listing 
 The Blues Is an Old Old Story (1:49)  (Alan Bergman/Marilyn Bergman)
 Street Cries (1:03) (Paul Weston)
 John Henry (2:46)  (Traditional/Weston)
 Sometimes I Feel Like a Motherless Child (:47)  (Traditional/Weston)
 Nobody Knows the Trouble I've Seen (2:29) (Traditional)
 The Blues Is a Tale of Trouble (1:45)   (Bergman/Bergman/Weston)
 Kansas City Blues (3:15)  (Bergman/Bergman/Weston)
 Memphis Blues (2:49)  (W. C. Handy/George Norton)
 The Blues Is a Traveling Thing (1:19) (Bergman/Bergman/Weston)
 He's Gone Away (2:18) (Traditional)
 Seems Like When It Comes in the Morning (0:27)
 Every Night When the Sun Goes In (2:38) (Traditional)
 Times Change and Things Change  (1:51) (Bergman/Bergman/Weston)
 Lover Man (4:00)  (Jimmy Davis/Ram Ramirez/Jimmy Sherman)
 Blues in the Night (3:14) (Harold Arlen, Johnny Mercer) 
 The Blues Is an Old Old Story (Reprise)   (0:50) (Bergman/Bergman)

References 

1959 albums
Jo Stafford albums
Columbia Records albums
Albums arranged by Paul Weston
Blues albums by American artists
Albums conducted by Paul Weston